BoConcept is a Danish retail furniture chain with 337 stores in 65 countries around the world. The first BoConcept Brand Store opened in Paris in 1993, but from 2006 onwards, all furniture is sold through franchisees. BoConcept specializes in customizable modern furniture and accessories designed by international designers.

History 
The company was founded in 1952 by two Danish craftsmen and cabinet makers, Jens Ærthøj and Tage Mølholm. The first pieces of furniture to leave the factory were cabinets made of oak veneer with a mid-section of walnut. In 1954, the owners and the four employees moved into their new furniture factory 'Ærthøj-Jensen and Mølholm Møbelfabrik'. The functionalism sweeping through Danish design during the 1950s influenced the designs of Ærthøj-Jensen and Mølholm. In 1962 the founders opened a new 1300m2 factory in Herning where the company is still located.

In 1976, the company changed its name to Denka with the intent to enter the international markets. The company's competitive edge relied on custom-made orders based on the consumer characteristics of different markets. The customization of furniture to the individual customer is still an important part of the business model. BoConcept employs interior designers to help customers create their individual furniture and interior design solutions. The company was introduced on the Copenhagen Stock Exchange in 1984 and has been owned by 3i, a leading international investor, since 2016.

In 2022, the company was strongly criticised for continuing their activities in Russia, after the invasion of Ukraine.

Products 
BoConcept offers customized design furniture and accessories, collaborating with a wide range of designers in creating the products. Interior design service is a big part of the BoConcept shopping experience, as customers can book a home visit and get advice on how to get the most out of their new interiors including 3D drawings and style tips.
Its mission is to create unique furniture that improves the new ways in which people live, work, and play. They create timeless iconic designs through Danish creativity and craftsmanship, which bring joy and inspiration. The marketability of Its products relies on their modularity, functionality, and quality.
In 2022, BoConcept celebrated its 70th anniversary. Their motto is: "Live Ekstraordinær".

Designers 
BoConcept collaborates with designers in Denmark and further afield, including Morten Georgsen, Karim Rashid, and Henrik Pedersen.

Awards 
2021: Luxury Lifestyle Awards 2021 ("Best Luxury Furniture and Homeware category") 
2019: Global Franchise Awards ("Best Lifestyle franchise category")
2017: The Good Design Award for the Ottawa sofa by Karim Rashid
2016: The Diploma of the Danish Export Association & HRH Prince Henrik’s Medal of Honor to franchisee Pablo Sardi
2013: The Red Dot Award for the Ottawa collection by Karim Rashid
2008: The Red Dot Award for the One chair
2007: Danish Franchisee Award

References 

Design companies of Denmark
Furniture companies of Denmark
Retail companies of Denmark
Companies based in Herning Municipality
Design companies established in 1952
Manufacturing companies established in 1952
Retail companies established in 1952
Danish companies established in 1952
Danish brands